The marriage penalty in the United States refers to the higher taxes required from some married couples with both partners earning income that would not be required by two otherwise identical single people with exactly the same incomes. There is also a marriage bonus that applies in other cases. Multiple factors are involved, but in general, in the current U.S. system, single-income married couples usually benefit from filing as a married couple (similar to so-called income splitting), while dual-income married couples are often penalized. The percentage of couples affected has varied over the years, depending on shifts in tax rates.

Progressive taxation rates combined with income splitting
NOTE: New US tax code passed into law in 2017 codified new marginal tax rates and brackets for those filing as single or as married filing jointly, among many other changes. Those new tax brackets substantially eliminated much of the "marriage penalty" discussed below. There is still some penalty that exists in certain situations (e.g. deductions for state and local taxes (SALT) are not doubled for those who are married filing jointly, there remains a 2% penalty on combined between $600,000 and $1,000,000, if there are multiple dependent children, etc.). There can also be a small penalty or benefit based upon whether the two individuals have a substantially similar or largely different income. Marriage bonuses can be as high as 21 percent of a couple’s income, and marriage penalties can be as high as 12 percent of a couple’s income. This entire article needs to be updated for the changes implemented with the new tax code because the following example, based upon 2013 US federal tax rates, is no longer accurate.

The US tax code fixes different income levels for passing from one marginal tax rate to another, depending on whether the filing is done as a single person or as a married couple. For lower incomes, the transition points for married couples are twice those for single persons, which benefits a couple that gets married if their incomes are sufficiently different. This is equivalent to "income splitting", meaning that the tax due is the same as if the two persons use the schedule for single persons, but with each declaring half the total income. At higher incomes, this equivalence is lost but there is still an advantage if the two incomes are sufficiently different.

If the incomes of the two persons are similar, then at the lower end of the tax schedule there is no difference between filing as singles and filing as a married couple (ignoring the question of deductions, see below). But at the higher end of the tax schedule, there is a penalty for a married couple whose incomes are similar, compared to what they would pay as singles.

For example, the following chart shows the US federal tax rates for 2013:

Under these tax rates, two single people who each earned $87,850 would each file as "Single" and each would pay a marginal tax rate of 25%. However, if those same two people were married, their combined income would be exactly the same as before (2 * $87,850 = $175,700), but the "Married filing Jointly" tax brackets would push them into a higher marginal rate of 28%, costing them an additional $879 in taxes.

In the most extreme case, two single people who each earned $400,000 would each pay a marginal tax rate of 35%; but if those same two people filed as "Married, filing jointly" then their combined income would be exactly the same (2 * $400,000 = $800,000), yet $350,000 of that income would be taxed as the higher 39.6% rate, resulting in a marriage penalty of $32,119 in extra taxes ($16,100 for the 39.6% bracket alone, plus the remainder is due to the higher phase out of the lower brackets.) Using the formulas for 2016 income, if both persons have a taxable income X greater than $415,050 then as singles each would pay 0.396X−$43830.05, whereas if they were married filing jointly they would pay 2(0.396X)−$54333.70, so they lose 2($43830.05)−$54333.70 or $33,326.40.

In some couples, the greater earner may benefit from filing as married, while the lesser earner from not being married. For example, consider two single people, one with an income of $100,000 (and therefore paying a marginal rate of 28%) and the other with no income (and therefore paying no income tax). By being married and filing jointly, the $100,000 earner reduces his/her bracket to the 25% rate, receiving a "marriage bonus" for a net tax savings of $364, while the nonearner goes from the 10% bracket to the 25% bracket on the first dollars earned upon entering the workforce.

It can be shown that it is mathematically impossible for a tax system to have all of (a) marginal tax rates that increase with income, (b) joint filing with (full) income splitting for married couples, and (c) combined tax bills that are (entirely) unaffected by two people's marital status. Partial income splitting models allow only a part of the income to be transferred among spouses in order to balance such criteria.

Deductions

The US tax code allows taxpayers to claim deductions (such as charitable contributions, mortgage interest, or payments for state taxes) on their income. Taxpayers can choose either an automatic standard deduction or else can choose to itemize their deductions. Two single people filing separate returns can each choose the deduction policy that benefits them more, but a married couple filing a single return will both be forced to use the same method (Title 26 U.S. Code §63(c)(6)(A)). For example, if one person has no significant deductions, the person can take the standard deduction ($12,400 as of 2020). A different person, who has, for example, $15,000 in itemizations (such as charitable contributions), they would be better off itemizing deductions since the standard deduction is much less.

If the two people were allowed to file separate tax returns, then each can claim the deduction policy that benefits them the most, and their total combined deduction would be $27,400 ($12,400 + $15,000). However, if the two people are combined on one "Married, filing jointly" tax return, then they would be forced to choose either itemizing their deductions ($15,000 combined) or else using the standard deduction ($12,400 per person, $24,800 combined). Either way, the married couple would receive less deductions than two otherwise identical single people with exactly the same income.

On the other hand, being married can result in less tax. If one person earns twice the sum of the standard deduction ($24,800 a year) and the other earns nothing, the wage earner would pay 10% (tax year 2020) of his total income as tax as a single, but as a couple their taxable income would be zero so they would pay no tax.

Social security/Medicare burden and subsidy to sole breadwinners and nonearning parents 

In connection with other taxation issues in the United States, one concern is that these marriages are subsidizing one-earner/one-nonearner parent couples in Social Security and Medicare benefits. For example, in social security and Medicare, two-earner couples pay taxes that create a surplus or at least pay for their own benefits (and receive reduced benefits such as reduced survivor benefits), while one-earner couples pay insufficient taxes that create a deficit and receive an extra, unfunded benefit of 50% or more in Social Security (i.e., a total of 150% or more), and 100% or more in Medicare (i.e. a total of 200% or more).

This problem is exacerbated by the fact Social Security and Medicare taxes are collected only on wage income, passive income such as capital and property earnings are exempt, and benefits are progressive.  This means that the chief tax burden for the programs is carried by two-earner families with wages that range between the mid-range and the cap and these families also receive fewer benefits than any other family structure or set-up.

Impact of current social security reform proposals and recent Medicare tax reform in the United States 

Proposals to "raise the cap" will continue to place an extra burden on 2-earner families where each partner has earned income (not capital gains or other property-based income that is exempt from the tax).

The Affordable Care Act added a tax on passive income and capital gains to support Medicare   but it is not known if this is sufficient to prevent the heavy burden faced by two-earner families in subsidizing sole breadwinner families and especially the burden faced by two-earner families with wages between the mid-range and the cap.  No such tax is yet imposed to support progressivity in Social Security benefits.

Relationship to reduction of government debt 

The Tax Policy Center also sees the current "marriage bonus" for sole breadwinners as the chief tax expenditure of the Bush tax cuts and a key contributor to the Federal debt.

The International Monetary Fund has called for the United States, Portugal and France, all countries with significant sovereign debt, to eliminate their practices, including income splitting, that charge 2-earner families higher taxes over single income families (whether married or not).

Non-US residents
The marriage penalty can be even worse in cases where one spouse is not a citizen or resident of the United States . Although that spouse cannot be required by US law to pay US taxes, since the US person is still required by law to file taxes on worldwide income, two choices are left. The US person may either file as 'Married Filing Separately' (or 'Head of Household' if they have at least one qualifying person who is not their spouse) or try to convince their spouse to voluntarily pay US income taxes on their income by filing a joint return. The former requires using the 'Married Filing Separately' or 'Head of Household' tax brackets, which are less beneficial than 'Married Filing Jointly'. The latter allows that person to use the more favorable 'Married Filing Jointly' tax brackets but requires paying tax on the non-US person's income, which would not be required for two otherwise identical single people.

See also 
 Bachelor tax
 Druker v. Commissioner of Internal Revenue
 Income splitting
 Kiddie tax
 Shared earning/shared parenting marriage
 Taxation in the United States

References

External links 
The Motley Fool: Death & Taxes: The Marriage Penalty
About.com: Marriage: The Marriage Tax Penalty
albuterol24.com : Marriage Affects Tax 
Tax Policy Center: Tax Topics: Marriage Penalty (TPC is a joint venture of the Urban Institute and Brookings Institution)

Marriage
Taxation in the United States